The BAPS Shri Swaminarayan Mandir of Abu Dhabi in UAE is a traditional Hindu place of worship that is being built by the BAPS Swaminarayan Sanstha. The site is located at Abu Mureikhah, which is near Al Rahba off the Dubai–Abu Dhabi Sheikh Zayed Highway. The mandir, upon completion, will be the first traditional Hindu stone mandir in the Middle East. The BAPS Swaminarayan Sanstha, which is headed by Mahant Swami Maharaj, is a denomination of the Swaminarayan branch of Hinduism. The mandir, inspired by Pramukh Swami Maharaj and blessed by Mahant Swami Maharaj, will be situated on 55,000 square meters of land. The mandir will be hand-carved by artisans in India and assembled in the UAE. The mandir will incorporate all aspects and features of a traditional Hindu mandir as part of a fully functional, social, cultural and spiritual complex. The complex will include a visitor center, prayer halls, exhibitions, learning areas, sports area for children, thematic gardens, water features, a food court, a books and gift shop.

Construction 
In August 2015, the UAE government announced the decision to provide land for building a Hindu mandir in Abu Dhabi, during Indian Prime Minister Narendra Modi's first official visit to the country. Sheikh Mohammed bin Zayed Al Nahyan, the Crown Prince of Abu Dhabi and Deputy Supreme Commander of the UAE Armed Force gifted the land for the mandir.

On 10 February 2018, BAPS representatives met Sheikh Mohamed and the Indian Prime Minister in the Presidential Palace. A memorandum of understanding was signed by India and the UAE in the presence of the entire royal family and over 250 local leaders. The Shila Pujan (foundation stone laying ceremony) for the mandir took place on 11 February 2018. The Shila Pujan marked the first vedic step in the mandir's construction. Prime Minister Narendra Modi witnessed the ceremony via live stream from the Dubai Opera House.

For the construction, tonnes of pink sandstone will be shipped from northern Rajasthan to Abu Dhabi. Marble from Europe may also be used to build the mandir. The temple foundation will be constructed without using steel or iron materials and will be built through the traditional Hindu temple architecture. Instead of steel, fly ash will be used as a reinforcement in concrete

In terms of size, it will be smaller than the Akshardham (Delhi) but similar to the Akshardham (New Jersey), with marble carvings against a sandstone building backdrop.

Foundation Stone Laying Ceremony 
The UAE Government as part of its year of tolerance program, allocated 14 more acres of land to BAPS Hindu Mandir in January 2019.

On 20 April 2019, the foundation stone-laying ceremony of the first traditional Hindu mandir in Abu Dhabi was performed in the presence of thousands of Indian community people and officials from India and the UAE. The ceremony was being administered as per Vedic rituals in the presence of Mahant Swami Maharaj, the spiritual leader of Bochasanwasi Akshar Purushottam Sanstha (BAPS) Swaminarayan Sanstha.

Festivals celebrated

On 15 August 2019, India's independence day, the mandir committee had celebrated the festival of Raksha Bandhan by inviting 1,200 blue collar workers from across many workers’ accommodations in the UAE.

The mandir celebrated Janmastami on 24 August 2019,  by feature a performance of devotional songs and narration of stories from Sri Krishna's life. Close to 4,000 devotees attended the festivities along with the Consul General of India in Dubai.

See also 
 Abu Dhabi Region
 Hinduism in Arab states
 Hindu mandir, Dubai
Shrinathji Temple, Bahrain
 Shiva mandir, Muscat

References

External links 
 

Hindu temples in the United Arab Emirates
Shiva temples
Religion in Abu Dhabi
Buildings and structures in Abu Dhabi
Swaminarayan temples
21st-century Hindu temples